Terenure College RFC was founded on 5 November 1940. It is a senior rugby club in Dublin, Ireland, playing in Division 1A of the All-Ireland League.

History
Terenure College RFC was founded on 5 November 1940. With a great love for the game and concerned that past pupils were not playing rugby union after leaving school, Rev. Fr Jackie Corbett, O.Carm., chaired a meeting of rugby playing past pupils of Terenure College in the Hotel Lenehan, Harcourt Street, Dublin. Those present included Johnny Corrigan, Hugh Clarke, Joe Clarke, Sean Ryan, P.P. Maguire, Colm O' Nolan, Niall Thunder, Hugh Milroy, Dick Dunlop, Des Giltrap, Jack Hearne and Dudley Fisher. Terenure Collegians Rugby Football Club was formed. Fr. Corbett was elected first President. J.P. Clarke was elected Hon. Secretary, Johnny Corrigan as Hon. Treasurer and Hugh Milroy as Club Captain.

Terenure played their first match shortly afterwards against the Terenure College SCT at the time. The club won 8 points to 3. It took until 8 January 1959 for Terenure to be promoted to a Senior club after fourteen applications to the Leinster Branch, that after winning five Junior 1 titles and many other trophies. Two years later Mick Hipwell was selected to play for Ireland, Terenure's first Irish international. Mick played against England at Twickenham.

The years 1965-7 were successful seasons for Terenure under the captaincy of Eddie Coleman (later to be IRFU president)and Eddie Thornton respectively, as they won the Leinster Senior league twice in a row. Terenure College RFC has had many players play for Ireland including Mick Hipwell, Brendan Sherry, Paul Haycock, Ciaran Clarke, Niall Hogan, David Corkery, Girvan Dempsey, and Eric Miller. Terenure has also supplied personnel to the Irish team at other levels including Paddy 'Rala' O'Reilly as Baggage Master to the Senior Team and British and Irish Lions for three Lions tours, Colin Phillips as Baggage Master to the Irish 'A', U21 and U19 Teams and the Japanese Senior Team, Liaison Officer to the Fijian Team on their Autumn Tour '09 and Samoan Team on their Autumn Tour '10, Argentina on their Autumn Tour 2012 Baggage Master/Assistant Manager Irish U20 2011/2012 for both Six Nations and Junior World Cup in Cape Town South Africa and Martin Searson as Baggage Master to U19's.

The Club now
Leinster have benefited greatly from Terenure's 'rugby factory' with former players such as Girvan Dempsey, David Blaney, Niall Hogan, Mark Egan, James Blaney, David McAllister and Brian Blaney playing for the province.

Terenure field the most adult teams in the province of Leinster, with seven adult teams fielded each week. In addition, more than 600 boys and girls play mini-rugby every Sunday. They have been crowned the best senior club in Ireland in the Energia All-Ireland League Award.

Terenure College has provided two Presidents of the IRFU - M. H. Carroll (1984–85) and E. Coleman (2000–01) and two president of the Leinster Branch - D. Lamont (2009–2010)

Coached by former Munster and Leinster hooker James Blaney and coaches John Coffey and Derm Blaney. Terenure play in the top division of the All Ireland League, having been promoted in 2014 from Division 1B on the back of promotion the previous season from Division 2A.

Honours

 Leinster Senior League
Winners 1983-84, 1995–96, 1998–99, 2000–01, 2019-20, 2022-23:  6
Leinster Senior Cup
Winners: 1965-66, 1966–67, 1993–94, 1995–96, 2021-22:  5
Metropolitan Cup
Winners: 1949, 1950, 1960, 1979, 1988, 1997, 1999:  7
All Ireland League
Division 2A Winners 2006, 2013: 2
Division 1B Winners 2014: 1

Internationals
Ireland
Mick Hipwell, Brendan Sherry, Paul Haycock, Ciaran Clarke, Niall Hogan, David Corkery, Girvan Dempsey, Isaac Boss, John Cooney
Barbarians
Mick Hipwell, Girvan Dempsey, Eric Miller
British and Irish Lions
Mick Hipwell, Eric Miller

See also
 Mark Egan
 Eric Miller
 Mick Hipwell

References

External links
Terenure College RFC
Terenure College RFC on Instagram
https://www.linkedin.com/company/terenure-college-rfc/ Terenure College RFC on LinkedIn]
https://www.facebook.com/TCRFC Terenure College RFC on Facebook]
Terenure College RFC on Twitter

 
Irish rugby union teams
Rugby union clubs in South Dublin (county)
University and college rugby union clubs in Ireland
Terenure
Senior Irish rugby clubs (Leinster)